The 1978 Somali coup d'état attempt was a violent military coup attempt that took place in Somalia (then Somali Democratic Republic) on 9 April 1978, against the regime of President Siad Barre. The United States Central Intelligence Agency estimated that the coup, led by Colonel Mohamed Osman Irro, involved around 24 officers, 2,000 soldiers, and 65 tanks. Following the failed coup, 17 alleged ringleaders, including Osman, were summarily executed by firing squad.

Background
The coup attempt was staged by a group of disgruntled Army officers, led by Colonel Mohamed Osman Irro, in the aftermath of the disastrous Ogaden War against Ethiopia (then ruled by the Mengistu-led Derg). The war was initiated by Siad Barre, who had himself come into power a decade earlier in the 1969 Somali coup d'état. 

A United States Central Intelligence Agency (CIA) memorandum written the following month speculated that the coup was in response to Barre ordering the arrest and execution of officers that participated in the Ogaden War. The officers believed that Barre had intentionally used troops from other clans as "cannon fodder" while officers from his own Marehan clan were given safer orders. The report concluded that the officers involved in the coup "were motivated at least as much by long-standing ethnic animosities toward Barre as by disenchantment with his regime in the aftermath of the Ogaden debacle".

Coup

The coup was launched on 9 April 1978. The bulk of the fighting concluded within the day.

Gunfire broke out at the village of Afgoy, south of the capital Mogadishu, and small-arms fire and explosions were heard on the outskirts of the capital. The coup was originally planned to start in Hargeisa, but Barre likely knew of the attempt in advance and was able to disrupt the coup before it launched, as well as position forces loyal to himself in the capital.

The CIA estimated that the coup involved around 24 officers, 2,000 soldiers, and 65 tanks.

Aftermath
Following the failed coup, 17 alleged ringleaders, including Osman, were summarily executed by firing squad. Barre used the coup as justification to purge members of the clans involved in the coup from government and military positions.

One of the plotters, Lieutenant Colonel Abdullahi Yusuf Ahmed, escaped to Ethiopia and founded an anti-Siad Barre organization initially called the Somali Salvation Front (SSF; later the Somali Salvation Democratic Front, SSDF), initiating the Somali Rebellion and eventually the Somali Civil War.

Allegation of Eastern Bloc involvement
Barre blamed the coup attempt on the Eastern Bloc, namely Soviet Union and Cuba, countries that supported Ethiopia in the Ogaden War, calling them "new imperialists". The CIA determined that the Soviet Union was not behind the coup attempt, but were seeking to remove Barre. Immediately following the coup, Somalia began receiving foreign aid from the People's Republic of China.

References

Military coups in Somalia
1970s coups d'état and coup attempts
Coup attempt
Conflicts in 1978
April 1978 events in Africa
Siad Barre
Coup d'état attempts in Africa